Daniel Vier (born May 16, 1982) is a German-Brazilian footballer who plays for FSV Fernwald.

External links
 
 Daniel Vier at Kicker

1982 births
Living people
Brazilian footballers
Brazilian people of German descent
Eintracht Frankfurt II players
VfB Stuttgart II players
1. FC Heidenheim players
3. Liga players
Association football defenders
TSV Eintracht Stadtallendorf players
Hessenliga players
Footballers from Porto Alegre